René Novotný (born 10 June 1963) is a Czech former competitive pair skater. With Radka Kovaříková, he is the 1995 World champion and 1995 European silver medalist.

Personal life 
Novotný was born on 10 June 1963 in Brno. He was married to Radka Kovaříková from 1996 to 2010. His second wife is named Soňa.

Skating career until 1988 
Novotný skated with Ingrid Ženatá from the late 1970s until 1981. Their partnership ended because she had spinal problems.

Partnership with Havlová 
Novotný's next partner was Jana Havlová. After winning bronze at the 1982 Prague Skate, they won the Czechoslovak national title. They went on to compete at two ISU Championships, placing 9th at the 1983 Europeans in Dortmund and 15th at the 1983 Worlds in Helsinki. Havlová struggled with ankle injuries. The partnership ended in 1984.

Partnership with Knapová 
In 1984, Novotný teamed up with Lenka Knapová. The pair won four Czechoslovak national titles and competed at seven ISU Championships; their best result, fourth, came at the 1987 European Championships in Sarajevo, Yugoslavia. They also competed at the 1988 Winter Olympics in Calgary, Alberta, Canada, but withdrew after placing 9th in the short program. Ivan Rezek served as their coach.

Making their final appearance together, Knapová/Novotný placed 8th at the 1988 World Championships in Budapest, Hungary. She retired due to knee problems.

Partnership with Kovaříková 

Novotný teamed up with Radka Kovaříková in 1988.

1989–1990 season 
They won the 1989 Prague Skate and took bronze at three events – the 1989 Nebelhorn Trophy, 1989 Grand Prix International de Paris, and 1989 Skate Electric. The pair placed sixth at the 1990 European Championships in Leningrad, Soviet Union, and 8th at the 1990 World Championships in Halifax, Nova Scotia, Canada.

1990–1991 season 
Kovaříková/Novotný won silver at the 1990 Skate America, bronze at the 1990 Nations Cup, and bronze at the 1990 Skate Electric. They placed fourth at the 1991 European Championships in Sofia, Bulgaria, and sixth at the 1991 World Championships in Munich, Germany.

1991–1992 season 
Kovaříková/Novotný received the silver medal at the 1991 Grand Prix International de Paris, bronze at the 1991 Nations Cup, and silver at the 1991 NHK Trophy. They placed third in the short program, fourth in the free skate, and fourth overall at the 1992 European Championships in Lausanne, Switzerland. They finished fourth at the 1992 Winter Olympics in Albertville, France, having ranked fourth in both segments.

They concluded their third season at the 1992 World Championships in Oakland, California. Ranked third after the short program, they overtook Canada's Isabelle Brasseur / Lloyd Eisler for the silver medal behind Natalia Mishkutionok / Artur Dmitriev (CIS). They were coached by Ivan Rezek until the end of the season.

1992–1993 season 
In autumn 1992, Kovaříková/Novotný moved to train in the United States, choosing Irina Rodnina as their coach. They took silver at two events, the 1992 Skate America and 1992 Grand Prix International de Paris. Ranked fifth in the short and third in the free, they finished fourth at the 1993 European Championships in Helsinki, Finland. They placed sixth in the short, fourth in the free, and fourth overall at the 1993 World Championships in Prague, Czech Republic.

1993–1994 season 
Kovaříková/Novotný received silver medals at the 1993 Skate Canada International and 1993 NHK Trophy. They placed third in the short program and fourth in the free skate at the European Championships in Copenhagen, Denmark; they finished just off the podium for the fourth consecutive year.

In February 1994, they placed sixth at the 1994 Winter Olympics in Hamar, Norway, having ranked fifth in the short and sixth in the free. They ended their season with a 5th-place result at the 1994 World Championships in Chiba, Japan.

1994–1995 season 
Kovaříková/Novotný won bronze at the 1994 Skate America and silver at the 1994 NHK Trophy. At the 1995 European Championships in Dortmund, Germany, the pair placed first in the short program and second in the free skate. They received the silver medal behind Germany's Mandy Wötzel / Ingo Steuer. Ranked first in both segments, they won gold at the 1995 World Championships in Birmingham, England, ahead of Russia's Evgenia Shishkova / Vadim Naumov.

Professional career 
Kovaříková/Novotný turned professional in 1995. They would win the World Professional Championships in 1995 and 1997. The pair toured with Stars on Ice for one season (1996-97) and continued to skate in shows around the world for a number of years.

Political career 
In 2014, Novotný was elected to Brno's city council as a member of ANO 2011. He was elected mayor of Brno-Židenice on 5 November 2014.

Results

With Kovařiková

With Knapová

With Havlová

With Ženatá

References

Navigation 

Czech male pair skaters
Olympic figure skaters of the Czech Republic
Figure skaters at the 1994 Winter Olympics
Figure skaters at the 1992 Winter Olympics
1963 births
Living people
World Figure Skating Championships medalists
European Figure Skating Championships medalists
Figure skaters from Brno